is a Japanese actress, voice actress and singer, employed by Music Ray'n. She received the Rookie of the Year award at the 3rd Seiyu Awards and the Synergy Award at the 9th Seiyu Awards. Tomatsu voiced Asuna Yuuki in Sword Art Online, Zero Two in Darling in the Franxx, Lala Satalin Deviluke in To LOVE-Ru, Kyoko Hori in Horimiya, Morgiana in Magi: The Labyrinth of Magic and Naruko "Anaru" Anjo in Anohana: The Flower We Saw That Day.

Tomatsu began a singing career in 2008, performing the song "Naissance" which was used as the ending theme to the television drama series Here Is Greenwood. Her second single "Motto Hade ni Ne" was used as the opening theme to Kannagi: Crazy Shrine Maidens. In 2009, she became part of the music unit Sphere, alongside Aki Toyosaki, Minako Kotobuki and Ayahi Takagaki. She released her first album Rainbow Road in 2010, and two compilation albums in 2016.

Career

Acting and Voice acting
Tomatsu was born in Ichinomiya, Aichi. Her voice acting career began when she participated in an audition held by Sony Music Entertainment Japan subsidiary Music Ray'n from 2005 to 2006. In January 2006, she participated in the Tōhō Cinderella audition held by Tōhō Entertainment.

Tomatsu made her voice acting debut in 2007, playing a student in Gakuen Utopia Manabi Straight!. That same year, she played her first starring role as Corticarte Apa Lagranges in Shinkyoku Sōkai Polyphonica.

After graduating from high school, Tomatsu moved to Tokyo in 2008 to go to university and to continue her voice acting career. That same year, she played the roles of Shiho Sannomiya in Zettai Karen Children, Lala Satalin Deviluke in To Love-Ru, and Nagi in Kannagi: Crazy Shrine Maidens. She then made her live-action debut as Mieko Nitta in the drama series Here Is Greenwood. She also played the role of Ami Misaki in the television drama series RH Plus. She received the Rookie of the Year Award at the 3rd Seiyu Awards.

In 2012, Tomatsu played Asuna Yuuki in Sword Art Online. In 2013, she received the Best Supporting Actress Award at the 7th Seiyu Awards, and the Synergy Award for her role in Yo-Kai Watch at the 9th Seiyu Awards. In 2018, she appeared as herself in the television drama series Koe Girl!, which featured her as a voice actress taking care of the series' main characters; the series also featured footage from one of her concerts. She also played Zero Two in Darling in the Franxx. In 2021 she played Kyoko Hori in Hori-san to Miyamura-kun.

Music
Tomatsu performed the song , which was used as the fourth ending theme for the series Kyōran Kazoku Nikki. Her next release was the song "Naissance", which was used as the ending theme to the drama series Here Is Greenwood. "Naissance", her first single, was released on September 3, 2008. Her second single and first anime-related single, was used as the opening theme to the anime television series Kannagi: Crazy Shrine Maidens; the single was released on October 28, 2009. Her third single  was released on November 26, 2008; the title track is used as the ending theme to Kannagi: Crazy Shrine Maidens.

In 2009, Music Ray'n formed the music unit Sphere, which consists of Tomatsu, Aki Toyosaki, Minako Kotobuki and Ayahi Takagaki. Her fourth single  was released on May 13, 2009; the title track is used as the ending to the anime series Shinkyoku Sōkai Polyphonica S. This was followed by her fifth single "Girls, Be Ambitious", which was released on February 8, 2010; the title track is used as the ending theme to the anime series Sound of the Sky. She released her first solo album Rainbow Road on February 24, 2010; the album peaked at No. 15 on the Oricon weekly charts and charted for four weeks. She then released her sixth single  on August 16, 2010. Her seventh single "Baby Baby Love", used as the ending theme to the 2010 anime television series Motto To Love-Ru, was released on November 3, 2010.

Her eighth single, "Oh My God", was released on July 25, 2011; the title track was used as the anime series Nekogami Yaoyorozu. This was followed by her ninth single  which was released on July 25, 2012; the title track was used as the first ending theme to the anime television series Sword Art Online. Her next release was her tenth single  which was released on October 29, 2012. Her second solo album Sunny Side Story, released on January 16, 2013, peaked at No. 5 on the Oricon weekly charted and charted for five weeks.

Her eleventh single, "Pachi Pachi Party", was released on July 22, 2013, and her 12th single  was released on January 27, 2014. She released her 13th single "Fantastic Soda!!" on August 11, 2014. This was followed by her 14th single "Courage", released on December 3, 2014, and used as the second opening theme to the anime television series Sword Art Online II. It became her best performing single to date, peaking at No. 4 on the Oricon weekly charts and charting for eleven weeks. Her third solo album Harukarisk*Land, released on March 18, 2015, peaked at No. 5 on the Oricon weekly charts and charted for four weeks.

Tomatsu released her fifteenth single "Step A Go! Go!" on October 12, 2015. This was followed by her sixteenth single , which was released on February 29, 2016. In July 2016, as part of Sphere, she made her North American live debut at Anime Expo. Her seventeenth single  was released on November 7, 2016; the song "Two of Us" is used as the theme song to the video game Sword Art Online: Hollow Realization. Her eighteenth single, was released on October 23, 2017; the title track is used as the ending theme to the anime series PriPri Chi-chan!!. She released her fourth solo album Colorful Gift on May 14, 2018. Her 18th single "Try & Joy" was released on September 5, 2018. Her 19th single "Resolution" was released digitally on October 13, 2019, and received a physical release on November 20, 2019; the title song is used as the third opening theme to the anime series Sword Art Online: Alicization.

Personal life
Tomatsu announced her marriage on her blog on January 11, 2019. She announced the birth of her first child, a girl, on February 9, 2021.

Filmography

Anime

Films

Original video animation (OVA)

Video games

Television drama

Drama CDs
 Aion – Seine Miyazaki
 Kyōran Kazoku Nikki – Senko Himemiya/Chika Midarezaki
 Shinako-i drama CD – Reiko Ibata
 To Love Ru – Lala Satalin Deviluke
 Twinkle Stars – Sakuya Shiina
 Hanikami, Kanojo wa Koi o Suru ～ Hana Mihen – Satsuki Myoga

Dubbing

Live-action

Animation

Discography

Albums
 Rainbow Road (2010)
 Sunny Side Story (2013)
 Harukarisk＊Land (2015)
 Best Selection ~Starlight/Sunshine~ (2016)
 Best Selection ~Starlight~ (2016)
 Best Selection ~Sunshine~ (2016)
 Colorful Gift (2018)

Singles
  (July 25, 2007) (Moetan Opening theme)
 "Naissance" (September 3, 2008)
 "Motto Hade Ni Ne!" (October 29, 2008) (Kannagi: Crazy Shrine Maidens Opening theme)
 "Musuhi no Toki" (November 26, 2008) (Kannagi: Crazy Shrine Maidens Ending theme)
 "Koi no Uta" (May 13, 2009) (Shinkyoku Sōkai Polyphonica Crimson S Ending theme)
 "Girls, Be Ambitious" (January 27, 2010) (Sound of the Sky Ending theme)
 "Nagisa no Shooting Star" (August 4, 2010)
 "Monochrome" (October 3, 2010) (Star Driver Insert song)
 "Baby Baby Love" (March 11, 2011) (Motto To Love-Ru Ending theme)
 "Oh My God" (July 13, 2011) (Nekogami Yaoyorozu Ending theme)
 "Yume Sekai" (July 25, 2012) (Sword Art Online Ending theme)
 "Q&A Recital!" (October 17, 2012) (My Little Monster Opening theme)
 "My Independent Destiny" (2012) (Sword Art Online Character song as Asuna Yuuki)
 "White Flower Garden" (2012) (Sword Art Online Character song as Asuna Yuuki)
 "Pachi Pachi Party" (July 10, 2013)

 "Hikari Gift" (January 15, 2014)
 "Fantastic Soda!!" (July 30, 2014)
 "Holy Lonely Justice" HappinessCharge PreCure! (Cure Fortune Character Song)
 "Get Music!" Pretty Rhythm Rainbow Live (Bell (Beru) Renjouji Character Song)
 "Courage" (December 3, 2014) (Sword Art Online II 2nd opening theme)
 "STEP A GO! GO!" (September 30, 2015)
 "Cinderella ☆ Symphony" (シンデレラ☆シンフォニー) (February 17, 2016)
 "Monokuro / Two of Us" (October 26, 2016)
 "Ubiquitous db" (feat. Rina Hidaka) (2017) (Sword Art Online Ordinal Scale Song As Asuna Yuuki)
 "Uchouten Traveler" (有頂天トラベラー) (October 11, 2017) (PriPri Chi-chan! 3rd ending theme)
"TRY & JOY" (September 5, 2018)

References

External links
  
 
 

1990 births
Living people
Anime singers
Japanese stage actresses
Japanese video game actresses
Japanese voice actresses
Musicians from Aichi Prefecture
People from Ichinomiya, Aichi
Seiyu Award winners
Sony Music Entertainment Japan artists
Voice actresses from Aichi Prefecture
21st-century Japanese singers
21st-century Japanese women singers